William Albert Sampen (born January 18, 1963) is a former professional baseball player who pitched in the Major Leagues from 1990-1994. He resides in Brownsburg, Indiana. Sampen owns an instructional baseball program in Brownsburg known as "Samp's Hack Shack.”  In 2016 Sampen founded the Indiana Expos youth travel baseball program.  The Expos have become one of the most well respected, fastest growing youth travel baseball programs in the state of Indiana for boys ages 13-17.

Career
In his first season, Sampen had a record of 12-7 and led the 1990 Montreal Expos in victories on a pitching staff that included Dennis Martínez, Oil Can Boyd and Kevin Gross. He made his MLB debut at age 27 on April 10, 1990, with two innings of one-hit relief in a 4-2 loss to the St. Louis Cardinals.

Sampen went 9-5 the following season, but had just four MLB victories thereafter. He was traded by the Expos to the Kansas City Royals on Aug. 29, 1992, and was out of baseball by 1994.

Personal life
His son, Caleb, played college baseball at Wright State University and was drafted in the 20th round of the 2018 MLB Draft by the Los Angeles Dodgers.

He attended Hartsburg-Emden High School in central Illinois, which had around 100-120 students total in grades 9-12.

References

External links 

 Baseball Almanac

1963 births
Living people
American expatriate baseball players in Canada
Baseball players from Illinois
California Angels players
Harrisburg Senators players
Indianapolis Indians players
Kansas City Royals players
MacMurray Highlanders baseball players
Major League Baseball pitchers
Montreal Expos players
Omaha Royals players
People from Lincoln, Illinois
Salem Buccaneers players
Vancouver Canadians players
Watertown Pirates players